Mikaelyan, Mikayelyan or Mikaelian (Armenian: Միքայելյան) is an Armenian surname meaning "son of Mikael" (Michael). It may refer to:
Aleksander Mikaelyan (born 1990), Armenian wrestler
Arman Mikaelyan (born 1996), Armenian chess grandmaster
Artur Mikaelyan (born 1970), Armenian and Greek amateur boxer
Christapor Mikaelian (1859–1905), Armenian revolutionary
Edvard Mikaelian (born 1950), Armenian artistic gymnast
Hovhannes Ter-Mikaelyan, Armenian politician
Karapet Mikaelyan (born 1969), Armenian football striker
Karen Mikaelyan (born 1932), Armenian and Russian statesman, diplomat and publicist
Marie-Gaïané Mikaelian (born 1984), Swiss tennis player 
Mikael Ter-Mikaelian, Armenian physicist
Mikael Ter-Mikaelian Institute for Physical Research in Armenia
Sergey Mikaelyan (1923–2016), Soviet film director 
Sergey Mikayelyan (born 1992), Armenian cross-country skier
Jeff Mikaelian (born 1958), Judo Instructor.

Armenian-language surnames
Patronymic surnames
Surnames from given names